SS Mary Luckenbach may refer to the following ships:

 , a Hog Islander, launched with that name, then taken up as USS Sac City (ID-3861); renamed Black Falcon (1932) and, again, Mary Luckenbach (1941); sunk by an aerial torpedo on 13 September 1942
 , a Design 1019 ship (ID-4556); renamed four times between 1936 and 1957; scrapped in 1963
 , a post-World War II name for the United States Navy attack cargo ship USS Waukesha (AKA-84); collided with and sank U.S. Navy hospital ship  in 1950; scrapped in 1970

Ship names